ASMD may refer to:
 Addition, subtraction, multiplication and division, the four elementary arithmetic operations
 Anterior segment mesenchymal dysgenesis, a form of agenesis
 "ASMD", a code used to refer to the Armstrong Siddeley Double Mamba gas turbine turboprop engine
 Anti-ship missile defence
 Another name for Niemann–Pick disease associated with the SMPD1 gene (types A and B)